I Am Fear is a 2020 horror film directed by Kevin Shulman.

Premise
A journalist is kidnapped by a sleeper cell of terrorists in the Los Angeles area who are threatening to behead her live over a webcast on July 4 weekend. As the date approaches, supernatural forces begin to influence the terrorist's sanity. The events of the film are set against the backdrop of Southern California wildfires.

Cast
 William Forsythe as Marco
 Bill Moseley as Steve Mcreedy
 Eoin Macken as Joshua
 Faran Tahir as Asad
 Kristina Klebe as Sara Brown
 Christian Oliver as Polo
 Guinevere Turner as Holly Simon
 Fahim Fazli as Rashid
 Victoria Summer as Alicia Minnette
 Joseph Gilbert as RJ Stock
 Tom Fitzpatrick as Professor
 Said Faraj as Bashu
 Joseph Kamal as Ra'ar
 Iyad Hajjaj as Ahmad
 Maggie Parto as Shabaviz's Wife
 Kelsa Kinsly as Prosecutor
 Alberto Zeni as Jalliel
 Ali Saam as Shabaviz

Release

I Am Fear received a theatrical release on February 20, 2020 in five markets. It was released on VOD, DVD and Blu-ray on March 3, 2020.

References

External links
 

2020 films
American thriller films
Films set in the United States
American action horror films
American science fiction horror films
Films shot in the United States
Films shot in North America
2020 horror films
2020s psychological horror films
2020s supernatural horror films
2020s English-language films
2020s American films